Sallinen is a Finnish surname. Notable people with the surname include:

 Tyko Sallinen (1879–1955), Finnish expressionist painter
 Aulis Sallinen (born 1935), Finnish contemporary classical music composer
 Raili Sallinen (born 1938), Finnish ski orienteering competitor
 Kari Sallinen (born 1959), Finnish orienteering competitor
 Tomi Sallinen (born 1989), Finnish professional ice hockey center
 Jere Sallinen (born 1990), Finnish professional ice hockey winger
 Oskari Sallinen (born 2001), Finnish professional football midfielder
 Hanna-Riikka Sallinen (born 1973), Finnish multi–sport high performance female athlete, played women's ice hockey, bandy, and rinkball

Finnish-language surnames